Marlon Rodrigues de Freitas (born 27 March 1995), known as Marlon Freitas, is a Brazilian professional footballer who plays as a midfielder for Botafogo.

Club career

Fluminense
Marlon was born in Magé, Rio de Janeiro, and joined Fluminense's youth setup in 2013. On 17 March 2015, he moved to Fort Lauderdale Strikers on a season-long loan deal.

Marlon made his senior debut on 4 April 2015, starting in a 0–1 home loss against New York Cosmos. He scored his first goal late in the month, netting his team's second in a 3–1 away success over Ottawa Fury. He returned to Fluminense in December 2015, after scoring eight goals in 31 appearances.

Upon returning, Marlon featured as an unused substitute for Flu during the 2016 season, before joining affiliate club ŠTK Šamorín on loan on 4 January 2017. He returned to his parent club in July, and made his first team – and Série A – debut on 9 July, starting in a 1–1 away draw against Bahia.

Marlon scored his first goal for Fluminense on 26 July 2017, netting the winner in a 2–1 Copa Sudamericana away success over Universidad Católica del Ecuador. Despite featuring more regularly for the side in the remainder of the 2017 season, he lost space in the 2018 campaign, and was subsequently loaned to Série B side Criciúma on 30 May 2018.

On 2 January 2019, Botafogo-SP announced the signing of Marlon on loan for the season. An immediate starter, he only missed one match in the 2019 Série B due to suspension.

Atlético Goianiense
Ahead of the 2020 season, Marlon signed a permanent contract with Atlético Goianiense, newly promoted to the top tier. On 22 October of that year, after becoming an undisputed starter, he renewed his contract until the end of 2022.

Career statistics

Honours
Atlético Goianiense
 Campeonato Goiano: 2020, 2022

References

External links

1995 births
Living people
Brazilian footballers
Association football midfielders
Campeonato Brasileiro Série A players
Campeonato Brasileiro Série B players
Fluminense FC players
Criciúma Esporte Clube players
Botafogo Futebol Clube (SP) players
Atlético Clube Goianiense players
Botafogo de Futebol e Regatas players
North American Soccer League players
Fort Lauderdale Strikers players
2. Liga (Slovakia) players
FC ŠTK 1914 Šamorín players
Brazilian expatriate footballers
Brazilian expatriate sportspeople in the United States
Brazilian expatriate sportspeople in Slovakia
Expatriate soccer players in the United States
Expatriate footballers in Slovakia
Sportspeople from Rio de Janeiro (state)
People from Magé